This is the discography of Jim Steinman, an American record producer, composer and lyricist, responsible for several hit songs. He also worked as an arranger, pianist, and singer. His work includes songs in the adult contemporary, rock and roll, dance, pop, musical theater, and film score genres.

Discography

Albums 
Albums in which Steinman participated in all songs.

Musicals and soundtrack collaborations

 A Man's a Man (1967)
 Baal (1968)
 The Beard (1968)
 The Dream Engine (1969)
 More Than You Deserve (1973)
 Rhinegold (1974)
 The Confidence Man (1976)
 Neverland (1977)
 A Small Circle of Friends (1980)
 Rude Awakening (1989)
 Tanz der Vampire (1997)
 Shrek 2 (2004)
 Bat Out of Hell The Musical (2017)

Other works
Other songs not released in the albums above.

External links
 

Discographies of American artists
Discography